John Montagu may refer to:
 John Montagu, 1st Baron Montagu (–), English nobleman
 John Montagu, 3rd Earl of Salisbury (–1400), English nobleman
 John Montagu (Trinity) (–1728), Master of Trinity College, Cambridge, 1683–1699
 John Montagu, 2nd Duke of Montagu (1690–1749), British peer
 John Montagu, 4th Earl of Sandwich (1718–1792), British statesman, claimed to be the eponymous inventor of the sandwich
 John Montagu (Royal Navy officer) (1719–1795), Commodore Governor for Newfoundland and Labrador, 1776–1778
 John Montagu, Marquess of Monthermer (1735–1770), British peer
 John Montagu, 5th Earl of Sandwich (1744–1814), British peer and Tory politician
 John Montagu (colonial secretary) (1797–1853), British army officer and Colonial Secretary of Van Diemen's Land and the Cape Colony
 John Montagu, 7th Earl of Sandwich (1811–1884), British peer and Conservative politician
 John Montagu, 11th Earl of Sandwich (born 1943), British entrepreneur and politician

See also
 John Montague (disambiguation)
 Montagu (disambiguation)